The 2014 Alabama Hammers season was the fourth season for the professional indoor football franchise and their third in the Professional Indoor Football League (PIFL). The Hammers were one of eight teams that competed in the PIFL for the 2014 season.

The team played their home games under head coach Dean Cokinos at the Von Braun Center in Huntsville, Alabama. The Hammers earned a 4–8 record, placing fourth in the American Conference, failing to qualify for the playoffs

Schedule
Key:

Regular season
All start times are local to home team

Roster

Division standings

References

External links
2014 results

Alabama Hammers
Alabama Hammers
Alabama Hammers